Jane Cortis (born 21 June 1948) is an Australian former swimmer. She competed in the women's 400 metre individual medley at the 1964 Summer Olympics. She finished fifth in her heat, and did not reach the final.

References

External links
 

1948 births
Living people
Olympic swimmers of Australia
Swimmers at the 1964 Summer Olympics
Place of birth missing (living people)
Australian female medley swimmers
20th-century Australian women